1997 Malta Open is a darts tournament, which took place in Malta in 1997.

Results

References

1997 in darts
1997 in Maltese sport
Darts in Malta